John Kotz may refer to:

John Kotz (basketball) (1919–1999), American basketball player
John Kotz (politician) (1930–2014), British Labour politician